Contemporary Indian Art was an exhibition held from September 18 – October 31, 1982 at The Royal Academy of Arts in London. The exhibition featured two sections, I. The Gesture, and Motif, which was on view from September 18 – October 5, 1982, and II. Stories, Situations, which was on view from October 9 – 31, 1982. The exhibition was co-curated by Akbar Padamsee, Richard Bartholomew, and Geeta Kapur.

The exhibition was part of the ''Festival of India,'' a six-month showcase for Indian culture and art co-sponsored by the governments of the United Kingdom and India. Prime Minister Indira Gandhi remarked at the opening, ''The links between our two peoples have always been unique. That is why this artistic celebration means so much to us, and to them.''

Concept 
The exhibition is a retrospective on the development and evolution of contemporary Indian art practices. The Festival Advisory Committee worked with major museums, galleries, and institutions, as well as private collectors and artists, to loan the final 133 artworks in the exhibition. The two separate installations of the exhibition, 'The Gesture, and Motif' followed by 'Stories, Situations', were created to highlight two different categories of artists working in or from India. The former category includes artists whose work have an emblematic quality with figures that are highly stylized. The second category includes artists whose work is more focused on story telling.

Part I of the exhibition was focused on exploring the history of movements among contemporary Indian artists, including modernism, abstraction, and aestheticism. These diverse artists and their practices were mostly united by an expressed interest in what the curator Geeta Kapur called the "revealed motif" or when the image itself transcends the specific historical conditions of its production.

The second part of the exhibition concentrated on works made primarily by a younger generation or artists. The work of nearly all of the painters and sculptors in 'Stories, Situations', is either figurative or episodic, and often reflects the details of the artists everyday lives. Many of the artists were also filmmakers and their work in that media could have influenced their focus on narrative in their paintings as well.

Participating artists 
45 artists were represented in the exhibition, with 133 artworks on display. Artists in the exhibition were A. Ramachandran, Adi Davierwalla, Akbar Padamsee, Anupam Sud, Arpita Singh, Bal Chhabda, Bhupen Khakhar, Bikash Bhattacharjee, Biren De, Dhruva Mistry, Francis Newton Souza, G.R. Santosh, Ganesh Pyne, Gieve Patel, Gulam Mohammed Sheikh, Himmat Shah, Jagdish Swaminathan, Jeram Patel, Jogen Chowdhury, K. Laxma Goud, K.C.S. Paniker, K.G. Subramanyan, Kanai Kunhiraman, Krishen Khanna, Krishna Reddy, Latika Katt, M.F. Husain, Manjit Bawa, Manu Parekh, Meera Mukherjee, Mohan Samant, Mrinalini Mukherjee, Nagji Patel, Nalini Malani, Nasreen Mohamedi, Ram Kumar, Ranbir Kaleka, S.H. Raza, Satish Gujral, Sudhir Patwardhan, Tyeb Mehta, V. S. Gaitonde, Ved Nayar, and Vivan Sundaram.

References 

Art exhibitions in London
Royal Academy
Indian contemporary art